Class 25 may refer to:

 British Rail Class 25, diesel-electric locomotive
 L&YR Class 25, 0-6-0 steam locomotive
 DRG Class ET 25, German electric multiples built for the Deutsche Reichsbahn in the 1930s.
 East German express locomotives operated by the DR after World War II:   
 DR Class 25.0, a Neubaulokomotive
 DR Class 25.10, a trials locomotive 
 South African Railways Class 25 and Class 25NC 4-8-4 steam locomotives.